The 1991 Lafayette Leopards football team was an American football team that represented Lafayette College during the 1991 NCAA Division I-AA football season. Lafayette tied for second in the Patriot League.

In their eleventh year under head coach Bill Russo, the Leopards compiled a 6–5 record. Dave Levine and Tim Moncman were the team captains.

The Leopards outscored opponents 312 to 277. Lafayette's 3–2 conference record earned a three-way tie for second in the six-team Colonial League standings.

Lafayette played its home games at Fisher Field on College Hill in Easton, Pennsylvania.

Schedule

References

Lafayette
Lafayette Leopards football seasons
Lafayette Leopards football